The 2010 NBL season was the 29th season of the National Basketball League. Foundation member and nine-time NBL champions the Auckland Stars withdrew from the league in 2010, while the Otago Nuggets returned after a one-year absence and the Southland Sharks joined for the first time.

The regular season began on Thursday 4 March and concluded on Friday 19 June. The playoffs began on Tuesday 22 June and concluded on Thursday 1 July, with the Wellington Saints taking home their sixth NBL title after defeating the Waikato Pistons 2–1 in the best-of-three finals series. Saints' guard Lindsay Tait was recognised as the most valuable player of the regular season and of the finals series.

Summary

Regular season standings

Playoff bracket

Awards

Player of the Week

Statistics leaders
Stats as of the end of the regular season

Regular season
 Most Valuable Player: Lindsay Tait (Wellington Saints)
 NZ Most Valuable Player: Thomas Abercrombie (Waikato Pistons)
 Most Outstanding Guard: Lindsay Tait (Wellington Saints)
 Most Outstanding NZ Guard: Lindsay Tait (Wellington Saints)
 Most Outstanding Forward: Thomas Abercrombie (Waikato Pistons)
 Most Outstanding NZ Forward/Centre: Thomas Abercrombie (Waikato Pistons)
 Scoring Champion: Eric Devendorf (Wellington Saints)
 Rebounding Champion: Alex Pledger (Waikato Pistons)
 Assist Champion: Lindsay Tait (Wellington Saints)
 Rookie of the Year: Martin Iti (Southland Sharks)
 Coach of the Year: Pero Cameron (Wellington Saints)
 All-Star Five:
 G: Lindsay Tait (Wellington Saints)
 G: Eric Devendorf (Wellington Saints)
 F: René Rougeau (Southland Sharks)
 F: Thomas Abercrombie (Waikato Pistons)
 C: Mika Vukona (Nelson Giants)

Playoffs
 Finals MVP: Lindsay Tait (Wellington Saints)

References

External links
Basketball New Zealand 2010 Annual Report
Basketball New Zealand 2010 Results Annual
Final round and end of season stats
2010 QF Media Guide

National Basketball League (New Zealand) seasons
NBL